Finland competed at the 1972 Winter Olympics in Sapporo, Japan.

Medalists

Biathlon

Men

 1 One minute added per close miss (a hit in the outer ring), two minutes added per complete miss.

Men's 4 x 7.5 km relay

 2 A penalty loop of 200 metres had to be skied per missed target.

Cross-country skiing

Men

Men's 4 × 10 km relay

Women

Women's 3 × 5 km relay

Ice hockey

First round
Winners (in bold) entered the Medal Round. Other teams played a consolation round for 7th-11th places.

|}

Medal round

USSR 9-3 Finland
Finland 5-1 Poland
Czechoslovakia 7-1 Finland
USA 4-1 Finland
Finland 4-3 Sweden
Team roster:
Jorma Valtonen
Ilpo Koskela
Seppo Lindström
Heikki Riihiranta
Heikki Järn
Juha Rantasila
Pekka Marjamäki
Jorma Vehmanen
Jorma Peltonen
Veli-Pekka Ketola
Matti Murto
Matti Keinonen
Harri Linnonmaa
Juhani Tamminen
Lasse Oksanen
Esa Peltonen
Seppo Repo
Lauri Mononen
Timo Turunen
Head coach: Seppo Liitsola

Nordic combined 

Events:
 normal hill ski jumping 
 15 km cross-country skiing

Ski jumping

Speed skating

Men

Women

References
Official Olympic Reports
International Olympic Committee results database
 Olympic Winter Games 1972, full results by sports-reference.com

Nations at the 1972 Winter Olympics
1972
W